Noor-ul-Haq Malekzai (born 2 April 1993) is an Afghan cricketer.  He is a right-handed batsman who bowls leg break.

Noor started representing Afghanistan in age group cricket, which culminated in the Afghanistan Under-19 cricket team qualifying for the 2010 ICC Under-19 Cricket World Cup in New Zealand, for the first time in their history.  This followed on from a successful 2009 ICC Under-19 Cricket World Cup Qualifier where he scored 216 runs at a batting average of 54.

His debut for the senior team came against Bahrain in the 2008 ACC Trophy Elite.  His debut in List-A cricket also came in his debut One Day International match against Scotland during Afghanistan's tour of Scotland in 2010.  During the match he scored 12 runs.

In Afghan domestic cricket he represents Kabul Province.

He made his Twenty20 debut for Amo Sharks in the 2017 Shpageeza Cricket League on 11 September 2017.

References

External links
Noor-ul-Haq at Cricinfo
Noor-ul-Haq at CricketArchive

1992 births
Living people
Afghan cricketers
Afghanistan One Day International cricketers
Mis Ainak Knights cricketers
Kabul Eagles cricketers